Hector Zazou (11 July 1948 – 8 September 2008) was a prolific French composer and record producer who worked with, produced, and collaborated with an international array of recording artists. He worked on his own and other artists' albums, including Sandy Dillon, Mimi Goese, Barbara Gogan, Sevara Nazarkhan, Carlos Núñez, Italian group PGR, Anne Grete Preus, Laurence Revey, and Sainkho since 1976.

Biography

Zazou first came to international attention as part of the ZNR duo with Joseph Racaille, where both played electric keyboards. Their 1976 debut album Barricade 3 was notable for its "strong Satie influence, stripped to minimal essentials, everything counts".

Long-time collaborators include trumpeter Mark Isham; guitarist Lone Kent; cellist and singer Caroline Lavelle; trumpeter Christian Lechevretel, who has appeared on all of Zazou's albums after Sahara Blue; clarinetist and flutist Renaud Pion, who has appeared on all of Zazou's albums since Les Nouvelles Polyphonies Corses; drummer Bill Rieflin; and Japanese recording artist Ryuichi Sakamoto.

His discography demonstrates his affinity for cross-cultural collaborations, and incorporated modern techniques and sounds in re-recordings of traditional material. He was influenced by Peter Gabriel's album Passion: Music for The Last Temptation of Christ in his fusion of musical polarities (traditional and modern, electronic and acoustic) on his own album Les Nouvelles Polyphonies Corses.

His groundbreaking 1983 album Noir et blanc (recorded with Congolese singer Bony Bikaye) garnered a lot of international attention, and is widely recognized as one of the earliest and most impressive experiments in fusing African and electronic music.

Zazou regarded his work during the 1980s as his time of apprenticeship in the studio. On his 1986 album, Reivax au Bongo, he experimented with fusing classical vocals with an electronic backdrop. On his 1989 album, Géologies, he combined electronic music with a string quartet.

The albums that he has released under his own name from the 1990s onwards are usually concept albums that draw from literary or folk sources and revolve around a specific theme. The collection of songs on each album assemble contributions from a diverse and global range of pop, folk, world music, avant-garde, and classical recording acts.

Zazou's 1992 offering, Sahara Blue, was based on an idea by Jacques Pasquier. Pasquier suggested Zazou commemorate the 100th anniversary of the death of author Arthur Rimbaud by setting music to Rimbaud's poetry. Contributions included spoken word from Gérard Depardieu, Dominique Dalcan and music by Brendan Perry and Lisa Gerrard of Dead Can Dance, Tim Simenon, and David Sylvian. He even adapted a traditional Ethiopian song.

In 1994, he released the album Chansons des mers froides (called Songs from the Cold Seas for the anglophone market). The album was based on ocean-themed traditional folk songs from northern countries, such as Canada, Finland, Iceland, and Japan. It featured vocals by pop and rock artists such as Björk, Suzanne Vega, John Cale, Värttina, Jane Siberry, and Siouxsie Sioux in addition to recordings of shamanic incantations and lullabies from Ainu, Nanai, Inuit, and Yakut singers. Musicians included Mark Isham, Brendan Perry, Budgie and the Balanescu Quartet. A cameraman accompanied Zazou on the project and they shot and recorded in Alaska, Canada, Greenland, Japan, Scandinavia, and Siberia. The single "The Long Voyage" was the only song to be an original composition from Zazou. He wrote it in gratitude to his record company Sony who gave him complete artistic liberty. Performed by Suzanne Vega and John Cale, it was released as a single in 1995. The single featured remixes by Mad Professor as well as Zazou himself.

His 1998 album, Lights in the Dark, showcased ancient Celtic music sung by Irish singers.

Zazou's collaborative 2000 album 12 (Las Vegas Is Cursed) with Sandy Dillon was regarded as a financial and critical failure. In the book "Sonora Portraits 2", which accompanies the CD Strong Currents, Zazou says that 12 (Las Vegas Is Cursed) was his most elaborate album. He describes it as a work of black humour and regards his instrumental composition "Sombre" on the album as one of his best songs ever.

Strong Currents was released in 2003 and featured an all-female vocal cast which included Laurie Anderson, Melanie Gabriel, Lori Carson, Lisa Germano, Irene Grandi, Nina Hynes, Jane Birkin, and Caroline Lavelle. Musicians included Ryuichi Sakamoto, Dennis Rea, Bill Rieflin and Archaea Strings. The album took six years to complete.

In 2004 Zazou released a companion CD of sorts, L'absence, which included instrumentals, many of the same female vocalists that were featured on Strong Currents, and one male vocalist, French singer Edo.

Zazou was a member of the musical collective named Slow Music. The lineup also included Robert Fripp and Peter Buck on guitars, Fred Chalenor on bass, Matt Chamberlain on drums, and Bill Rieflin on keyboards and percussion. He contributed electronics to the group's music. At the same time, he was exploring other electronic music in other work, including a soundtrack for Carl Theodor Dreyer's silent film La passion de Jeanne d’Arc and the multimedia collaboration released as a CD in 2006, Quadri+Chromies.

Zazou's last projects are documented on the Music Operator interactive multimedia web site, which graphically documents his collaborations while in the background his music plays. In January 2008 Hector Zazou released his Corps électriques album, featuring "one of the original riot grrrls" KatieJane Garside, Bill Rieflin, Lone Kent and nu-jazz trumpeter Nils Petter Molvær.

The last project he worked on is an album entitled In the House of Mirrors, on Crammed Discs, in which he offered a new take on classical Asian music, subtly reprocessed with a nod to some of the music produced in the '70s by Terry Riley and Fripp & Eno. In the House of Mirrors was recorded in Mumbai with the collaboration of four outstanding instrumentalists from India and Uzbekistan, as well as guests such as Diego Amador and Nils Petter Molvær. This album came out only a few weeks following his death in September 2008.

Discography

Albums
 1976 ZNR – Barricades 3 (Isadora)
 1978 ZNR – Traité de mécanique populaire (Scopa Invisible)
 1979 La perversita (Scopa Invisible)
 1983 Zazou / Bikaye / CY1 – Noir et blanc (Crammed, CD-reissue with extra tracks, 1990)
 1984 Géographies (Crammed/Made to Measure Vol. 5)
 1985 Zazou / Bikaye – Mr. Manager (Crammed/Pow Wow)
 1985 Reivax au Bongo (Crammed/MTM 2)
 1988 Zazou / Bikaye – Guilty! (Crammed)
 1989 Géologies (Crammed/MTM 20)
 1989 Géographies / 13 proverbes Africains (Crammed/MTM 5, CD-reissue) 
 1991 Les Nouvelles Polyphonies Corses with Hector Zazou – Les Nouvelles Polyphonies Corses (Phonogram France)
 1991 Various Artists – Nunc Musics (Taktic, compilation with two tracks by Zazou)
 1992 Sahara Blue (Crammed/MTM 32)
Lead vocalists: Samy Birnbach, Richard Bohringer, John Cale, Dominique Dalcan, Sussan Deyhim, Lisa Gerrard and Brendan Perry of Dead Can Dance, Gérard Depardieu, Anneli Drecker, Barbara Gogan, Khaled, Ketema Mekonn, Malka Spigel, David Sylvian (as "Mr. X")
Contributors: Kent Condon, Yuka Fujii, Kenji Jammer, Vincent Kenis, Nabil Khalidi, Bill Laswell, Christian Lechevretel, Keith Leblanc, Lightwave, Gilles Martin, Denis Moulin, Renaud Pion, Ryuichi Sakamoto, Steve Shehan, Guy Sigsworth, Tim Simenon, Elizabeth Valetti, Daniel Yvinec, Mr. X
 1993 Sainkho – Out of Tuva (Crammed)
 1994 Penta Leslee Swanson – Sorrow and Solitude (ErdenKlang)
 1994 Chansons des mers froides / Songs from the Cold Seas (Columbia)
Lead vocalists: Björk, John Cale, Tokiko Kato, Lioudmila Khandi, Kilabuk & Nooveya, Catherine-Ann MacPhee, Wimme Saari, Jane Siberry, Siouxsie Sioux, Värttina, Suzanne Vega, Lena Willemark
Contributors: Ainu dancers of Hokkaidō, Balanescu Quartet, Budgie, Tchotghtguerele Chalchin, Barbara Gogan, Mark Isham, Lightwave, Sargo Maianagacheva, Demnine Ngamtovsovo, Brendan Perry, Marc Ribot, Sakharine Percussion Group, Noriko Sanagi, Sissimut Dance Drummers, Angelin Tytot
 1995 Harold Budd & Hector Zazou – Glyph (Crammed/MTM 37)
 1997 Barbara Gogan with Hector Zazou – Made on Earth (Crammed)
 1998 Lights in the Dark (Warner Music France)
Lead vocalists: Breda Mayock, Katie McMahon, and Lasairfhiona Ni Chonaola.
Contributors: Pierre d'Aquin, John B., Richard Bourreau, André Compostel, Kent Condon, Francoise Debout, Papa D'jabate, Peter Gabriel, Mark Isham, Caroline Lavelle, Lucie de Lisieu, Germain de Loing, Denis Mc Ardle, Didier Malherbe, Kristen Noguez, Carlos Núñez, Brendan Perry, Hossam Ramzay, Minna Raskinen, Thierry Robin, Ryuichi Sakamoto, Noriko Sanagi, Silap' (choir), Ivan Tchekine, The Wiltshire Souls, and Daniel Yvinec.
 1998 Mimi – Soak (Luaka Bop, four tracks produced by Zazou)
 1999 Carlos Núñez – Os amores libres (BMG)
 1999 Laurence Revey – Le creux des fées (Naïve)
 2000 Sandy Dillon & Hector Zazou – 12 (Las Vegas Is Cursed) (Crammed/First World)
 2001 Arlo Bigazzi / Claudio Chianura / Lance Henson – Drop 6 — The Wolf and the Moon (Materiali Sonori compilation, including "The Abandoned Piano (War Version)" by Zazou with William Orbit)
 2001 Anne Grete Preus – Alfabet (WEA, Zazou produced two tracks)
 2002 PGR – Per grazia ricevuta (Mercury)
 2003 Sevara Nazarkhan – Yol Bolsin (Real World)
 2003 Strong Currents (Materiali Sonori)
Lead vocalists: Laurie Anderson, Jane Birkin, Lori Carson, Melanie Gabriel, Lisa Germano, Irene Grandi, Nicola Hitchcock, Nina Hynes, Caroline Lavelle, Sarah Jane Morris, Catherine Russell, Emma Stow
Contributors: Archaea Strings, Stefano Bollani, Pierre Chaze, Mathias Desmiers, Lone Kent, Carlos Núñez, Renaud Pion, Dennis Rea, Bill Rieflin, Ryuichi Sakamoto
 2004 L'absence (Taktic)
Lead vocalists:  Asia Argento, Katrina Beckford, Lucrezia von Berger, Edo, Nicola Hitchcock, Caroline Lavelle, Laurence Revey, Emma Stow 
 2006 Hector Zazou and Bernard Caillaud – Quadri+Chromies (CD and DVD, Materiali Sonori/Taktic)
 2006 Slow Music Project (one live CD, and several live downloads on the King Crimson website DGMLive.com)
 2008 Hector Zazou / KatieJane Garside – Corps électriques (Signature)
Contributors: Bill Rieflin, Lone Kent and Nils Petter Molvær
 2008 Hector Zazou & Swara – In the House of Mirrors (Crammed)
 2010 Hector Zazou, Barbara Eramo and Stefano Saletti - Oriental Night Fever - published by Materiali Sonori and licensed by Naïve Records
 2011 Eva Quartet & Hector Zazou – The Arch (Elen Music)

Singles
 1983 Hector Zazou / Papa Wemba -Malimba (12" single, Crammed)
 1984 Zazou / Bikaye / CY1 – M'Pasi Ya M'Pamba (12" single, Crammed)
 1985 Zazou / Bikaye – Mr. Manager (7" and 12" singles, Crammed)
 1988 Zazou / Bikaye – Guilty! / Na Kenda (12" single, Crammed)
 1990 Zazou / Bikaye – Get Back (Longwa) (12" single, SSR/Crammed)
 1992 "I'll Strangle You" featuring Anneli Drecker and Gérard Depardieu (Crammed)
 1992 "Sahara Blue (Trois inédits)" featuring Ryuichi Sakamoto, Barbara Gogan, and Steven Brown of (Tuxedomoon) (Columbia) 
 1995 "The Long Voyage" featuring John Cale and Suzanne Vega (Columbia) 
 1996 Hector Zazou & Harold Budd – Glyph Remixes with remixes by Herbert, Phume, and The Solid Doctor (12", SSR/Crammed)

Film soundtracks 

 Pygmées (1986), Regie: Raymond Adam
 Driving Me Crazy (1988), Regie: Nick Broomfield
 Der lange Schatten der Melancholie (1994), Regie:  Susanne Freund
 Enquête sur le monde invisible (2002), Regie: Jean-Michel Roux
 Djanta (2007), Regie: Tassere Ouédraogo

Videography 

 The Long Voyage, Hector Zazou with Suzanne Vega and John Cale (1994) Director: Hector Zazou
 Scott Walker: 30 Century Man (2006) Dokumentary about Scott Walker as Zazou himself.

References

External links
 Music Operator, now defunct, retrieved November 5, 2012
 
 
 Hector Zazou on the website of Crammed Discs (the label with which he released 11 of his albums).
 Taktic Music bio. Retrieved November 5, 2012
 Paul Tingen on Hector Zazou and Songs from the Cold Seas published by Sound on Sound in June 1995. Retrieved November 5, 2012
 Necrology for Hector Zazou on Europopmusic.eu. Retrieved November 5, 2012
 "Hector Zazou – Formative producer of world music." Obituary by Garth Cartwright on Guardian.co.uk from September 24, 2008. Retrieved November 5, 2012	

1948 births
2008 deaths
French record producers
French musicians
French songwriters
Male songwriters
Columbia Records artists
People from Sidi Bel Abbès
French people of Algerian descent
20th-century French musicians